Eudonia ombrodes is a moth of the family Crambidae. It is endemic to the Hawaiian islands of Oahu, Molokai, Maui, Lanai and Hawaii.

Subspecies
Eudonia ombrodes ombrodes (Oahu, Molokai, Maui, Lanai, Hawaii)
Eudonia ombrodes perkinsi Zimmerman, 1958 (Oahu, Molokai, Lanai, Hawaii)

External links

Eudonia
Endemic moths of Hawaii
Moths described in 1888